Paul Chapman may refer to:

People
Paul Wadsworth Chapman (1880–1954), American banker and businessman
Paul Chapman (actor) (born 1939), British actor
Paul Chapman (footballer, born 1951), Welsh football player for Plymouth Argyle
Paul Chapman (musician) (1954–2020), Welsh rock guitarist
Paul Chapman (Australian footballer) (born 1981), Australian rules footballer

Other
Paul Chapman Publishing